Ranjit Debbarma is the current commander general of the All Tripura Tiger Force. He is wanted by Interpol for criminal conspiracy and weapons trafficking.

Upon the surrender of Mantu Koloi, second in command of one of the National Liberation Front of Tripura's factions, he requested that Ranjit Debbarma engage in talks with the Government of India to resolve the crisis, but Debbarma vowed to fight on.

References

Tripuri nationalism
1959 births
Living people